Fifteen cyclists from Denmark have won a total of 25 Tour de France stages as of the 2022 Tour de France. Bjarne Riis and Michael Rasmussen have each won four stages. Rolf Sørensen, Søren Kragh Andersen, Magnus Cort and Jonas Vingegaard have won two. Nine other Danes have won one stage.

The first Danish stage winner was Mogens Frey in 1970. His team owner Jean de Gribaldy wanted the team captain Joaquim Agostinho to win. Agostinho actually crossed the line first but was disqualified for holding back Frey by grabbing his handlebar.

Two Danes have won the general classification, Bjarne Riis in 1996 and Jonas Vingegaard in 2022.

The women's race Tour de France Femmes started in 2022 where Cecilie Uttrup Ludwig won stage 3 from Reims to Épernay.

See also 
 
 Cycling in Denmark

References 
 
 
 
 

Danish Tour de France stage winners
Tour de France